The Man Who Wouldn't Talk may refer to:

 The Man Who Wouldn't Talk (1940 film), a 1940 American film directed by David Burton
 The Man Who Wouldn't Talk (1958 film), a 1958 British film directed by Herbert Wilcox